Stade Municipal is a football stadium in Schifflange, in south-western Luxembourg and is currently the home stadium of FC Schifflange 95. The stadium has a capacity of 3,500.

References
World Stadiums - Luxembourg

Municipal, Schifflange
Schifflange